Thelymitra silena, commonly called the madonna sun orchid, is a species of orchid that is endemic to Tasmania. It has a single thick, fleshy, channelled leaf and up to fifteen pale blue flowers with an almost spherical yellow lobe on top of the anther.

Description
The lobe on the top of the anther is light brown and gently curved with a yellow, almost spherical tip but with a deep notch. The side lobes are curved with sparse toothbrush-like tufts of white hairs. Flowering occurs in October and November.

Taxonomy and naming
Thelymitra silena was first formally described in 1999 by David Jones from a specimen collected on Clarke Island and the description was published in The Orchadian. The specific epithet (silena) is derived from the Latin word meaning "a bearded, bald, woodland deity, similar to but older
than a satyr", referring to the column of this orchid.

Distribution and habitat
The madonna sun orchid usually grows in grassy forest and is found near the north and east coasts of Tasmania and on Clarke Island.

References

External links
 

silena
Endemic orchids of Australia
Orchids of Tasmania
Plants described in 1999